Minou Reeves(b. 1946) is an Iranian writer, translator, and former politician.

Biography
Reeves was born in Tehran, Iran in 1946. She was a politician until 1979. At the time of the Iranian Revolution, Reeves was Queen Farah's international secretary.
Reeves was married to Professor Nigel Reeves.

Books
 Female Warriors of Allah 
 Behind the Peacock Throne
 Muhammad in Europe

References

1946 births
Living people
Iranian expatriate academics
Iranian women writers
Iranian literary critics
Literary critics of English
Iranian critics
Iranian women critics